Pochettino is a surname. Notable people with the surname include:

 José Luis Pochettino (born 1965), Argentine professional footballer
 Mauricio Pochettino (born 1972), Argentine football manager and former footballer
 Tomás Pochettino (born 1996), Argentine professional footballer